Shenieka Paul is a Trinidad and Tobago footballer who plays as a midfielder. She has been a member of the Trinidad and Tobago women's national team.

International career
Paul represented Trinidad and Tobago at the 2014 CONCACAF Girls' U-15 Championship, the 2016 CONCACAF Women's U-17 Championship qualification and the 2018 CONCACAF Women's U-20 Championship. At senior level, she capped during the 2018 CFU Women's Challenge Series.

International goals
Scores and results list Trinidad and Tobago' goal tally first.

References

Living people
Women's association football midfielders
Trinidad and Tobago women's footballers
Trinidad and Tobago women's international footballers
Year of birth missing (living people)